Scaptesyle fovealis is a moth in the subfamily Arctiinae. It was described by George Hampson in 1903. It is found on New Guinea.

References

Moths described in 1903
Lithosiini